Peer Review Week is an annual scholarly communication event celebrating the value of peer review. It takes place globally during the September in a multitude of locations both on- and offline. Typical activities include blogs, webinars, video and social media. Since 2016, each week has been themed, with the most recent focussing on "Identity in Peer Review".
Over 35 organizations now participate in the planning of the week, including scholarly societies, university libraries, publishers, vendors, funders and more.

History 
Peer Review Week was founded in 2015. Founding organisations included ORCID, ScienceOpen, Sense about Science and Wiley (publisher).

Theme 
The 2021 theme is "Identity in Peer Review"
In 2020, the theme was “Trust in Peer Review”
In 2019, the theme was “Quality in Peer Review”
In 2018, the theme was  “Diversity in Peer Review”
In 2017, the theme was “Transparency in Peer Review”
In 2016, the theme was “Recognizing Peer Review”

References

External links
 Official website
 Youtube channel

Scholarly communication